Podunavlje may refer to:

 Podunavlje, the name of the Danube river basin parts located in Serbia and Croatia
 Podunavlje District, a district in Serbia
 Podunavlje, a formerly proposed new administrative division of Serbia, roughly corresponding to present-day Southern and Eastern Serbia
 Podunavlje (Novi Sad), one of seven former municipalities of Novi Sad City in Serbia
 Podunavlje, Bilje, a settlement in Croatian Baranja
 Gornje Podunavlje, a protected nature reserve in Serbian part of Bačka